Manastash Ridge is a long anticline mountain ridge located in central Washington state in the United States. Manastash Ridge runs mostly west-to-east in Kittitas and Yakima counties, for approximately 50 miles. The ridge is part of the Yakima Fold Belt of east-tending long ridges formed by the folding of Miocene Columbia River basalt flows.

The name Manastash comes from the Sahaptin word /máːmaštaš/, possibly meaning "we are going root digging".

In addition to Manastash Peak, Manastash Ridge includes the peaks of Quartz Mountain, Mount Clifty, and Lookout Mountain.

References

External links
Manastash Ridge road conditions
Bivouac.com - Canadian Mountain Encyclopedia - Manastash Region page
Manastash Ridge Observatory page

Ridges of Washington (state)
Landforms of Kittitas County, Washington
Ridges of Yakima County, Washington
Washington placenames of Native American origin